Carança is a river in Pyrénées-Orientales, France. It flows into the Têt at Thuès-Entre-Valls.

References

Rivers of Pyrénées-Orientales
Rivers of France
Rivers of Occitania (administrative region)